The 2018 Ironman World Championship was a long distance triathlon competition held on October 13, 2018, in Kailua-Kona, Hawaii that was won by Patrick Lange of Germany and Daniela Ryf of Switzerland. It was the 42nd edition of the Ironman World Championship, which has been held annually in Hawaii since 1978. The championship was organized by the World Triathlon Corporation (WTC). For Ryf it was her fourth consecutive Ironman World Championship win. For Lange it was his second consecutive. They set a new overall course record previously set by them in 2016 and 2017 respectively.

Championship results

Men

Women

Notes

Sources

External links
 Ironman website

2018 in sports in Hawaii
Ironman
Ironman World Championship
Sports competitions in Hawaii
Triathlon competitions in the United States